XEFB-AM is a radio station on 630 AM in Monterrey, Nuevo León, Mexico. It is owned by Grupo Acustik. The frequency is currently silent.

History
XEFB received its concession on September 1, 1932. It originally operated on 1315 kilohertz with 100 watts. Jesús Quintanilla, the original concessionaire, sold XEFB to Emisoras Incorporadas de Monterrey in 1945. In 1958, XEFB-TV launched, Monterrey's first local station; it is now part of Televisa.

XEFB later moved to 630 kHz.

In 2015, Emisoras Incorporadas de Monterrey was replaced by Radio Emisora XHSP-FM as the concessionaire as part of a restructuring of the stations then owned by Grupo Radio México. GRM merged with corporate cousin Grupo Radio Centro in 2016.

References

Mass media in Monterrey
Grupo Radio Centro